Yashpal Jain (1912 - 2000) was an Indian writer. 

He was born on 1 September 1912 at Vijaygarh, in Aligarh district, United Provinces of Agra and Oudh, British India. He published many books, including children's books. Ajanta Ellora, Ahimsa, the Infallible Weapon and Pilgrimages of India are some of his notable works. The Government of India awarded him the fourth highest civilian award of Padma Shri in 1990.

He died on 10 October 2000.

References

Recipients of the Padma Shri in literature & education
1912 births
People from Aligarh district
Novelists from Uttar Pradesh
2000 deaths
Indian children's writers
20th-century Indian novelists